Gabriel N'Gandebe (born 30 March 1997) is a Cameroonian/French rugby union player who plays for Montpellier HR in the Top 14. His usual playing  position is wing.

References

External links
 
 
 Gabriel Ngandebe on "montpellier-rugby.com" 

1997 births
Living people
French rugby union players
Cameroonian rugby union players
Cameroonian emigrants to France
Sportspeople from Douala
RC Massy players
Montpellier Hérault Rugby players
Rugby union wings